These are the official results of the Men's 50 km walk event at the 1990 European Championships in Split, Yugoslavia, held on 31 August 1990. There were a total number of fifteen athletes, who finished the race.

Medalists

Abbreviations
All times shown are in hours:minutes:seconds

Results

Final
31 August

Participation
According to an unofficial count, 31 athletes from 13 countries participated in the event.

 (1)
 (3)
 (3)
 (2)
 (3)
 (3)
 (3)
 (1)
 (3)
 (3)
 (2)
 (3)
 (1)

See also
 1988 Men's Olympic 50km Walk (Seoul)
 1991 Men's World Championships 50km Walk (Tokyo)
 1992 Men's Olympic 50km Walk (Barcelona)
 1994 Men's European Championships 50km Walk (Helsinki)

References

External links
 Results

Walk 50 km
Racewalking at the European Athletics Championships